Drummond is a federal electoral district in Quebec, Canada, that has been represented in the House of Commons of Canada since 1968.
It was created in 1966 from Drummond—Arthabaska, Nicolet—Yamaska and Richmond—Wolfe.

Geography

The riding, located along the Saint-François River in the Quebec region of Centre-du-Québec, consists of the RCM of Drummond. The largest city is Drummondville.

The neighbouring ridings are Bas-Richelieu—Nicolet—Bécancour, Richmond—Arthabaska, Shefford, and Saint-Hyacinthe—Bagot.

There were no changes to this riding from the 2012 electoral redistribution.

Members of Parliament

This riding has elected the following Members of Parliament:

Election results

			

Note: Conservative vote is compared to the total of the Canadian Alliance vote and Progressive Conservative vote in the 2000 election.

	

	

	

	

	
Note: Social Credit vote is compared to Ralliement créditiste vote in the 1968 election.

See also
 List of Canadian federal electoral districts
 Past Canadian electoral districts

References

Riding history from the Library of Parliament
Campaign expense data from Elections Canada

Notes

Drummondville
Quebec federal electoral districts